The Man from Snowy River is a 1920 film made in Australia.  The film was silent and filmed in black and white, and was based on the Banjo Paterson poem of the same name. It is considered a lost film.

Plot
A country boy, Jim Conroy, is living a dissolute life in the city, running around with vamp Helen Ross. When his father cuts him off, he is dumped by Helen and returns to the bush.

Jim works for a corrupt squatter, Stingey Smith, and falls in love with Kitty Carewe, daughter of John Carewe, the squatter next door. John is impressed with Jim's skill with a horse and invites him to train his finest horse, "Swagman", hoping to win enough prize money to save his farm.

A jealous farm hand plots with Smith to fix the race so that the latter can take over the Carewe farm, letting "Swagman" go and run with the brumbies. However Jim rescues the horse and rides it to victory.

Smith frames Jim for theft but he is proved innocent and Jim marries Kitty.

Cast
Cyril Mackay as Jim Conroy
Stella Southern as Kitty Carewe
Tal Ordell as Stingey Smith
Hedda Barr as Helen Ross
John Cosgrove as Saltbush Bill
Robert MacKinnon as Dick Smith
John Faulkner as John Carewe
Charles Beetham as Bill Conroy
Dunstan Webb as Ryan
Nan Taylor as Mrs Potts
James Coleman as Trooper Scott
Con Berthal as cook

Production

Development
Beaumont Smith bought the film rights to all the works of Banjo Paterson and spent two years writing a script. The copyright was held by Angus Robertson in entirety but they passed some of the money on to Paterson.

Smith incorporated characters from various Paterson works, including squatter's daughter, Kitty Carewe, and swagman, Saltbush Bill. The character of Helen Ross, however, was Smith's original invention.

Smith later claimed the price of the film rights was the highest ever that had been paid in Australian cinema, with the exception of The Sentimental Bloke (1919).

In January 1919 Snowy Baker announced he would star in the film based on Smith's script. It was reported that "a start has already been made with the picture on Mr. Erie McKellar's station, where every facility is offered for the aiming of such thrills as the great ride from "Rio Grande," the bushranging scenes from "Conroy's Gap," and the tight from "Salt Bush Bill". Smith said the film would incorporate matters he had learned in America and would be released via E.J. Carroll.

However Baker wound up not appearing in the film. In November 1919 Smith announced he would make the movie in Hollywood, as an attempt to break into the US market.

He left in November 1919 but returned to Sydney within six months, bringing back with him a documentary about Hollywood, A Journey through Filmland, which he released in Sydney in February 1921.

In March 1920 he announced he would make the film in Australia. In May 1920 it was reported fIlming was delayed by the unavailability of film stock.

Casting
Smith used American talent available in Australia, including John K. Wells, who was assisting Wilfred Lucas on the Snowy Baker movies, and visiting actress Hedda Barr. (At one stage it was announced Snowy Baker would star but this did not eventuate.)

Cyril Mackay was a stage actor who had retired after suffering a nervous breakdown. He came out of retirement to play the role.

The movie marks the film debut of movie star Stella Southern, who was working as a shop girl when discovered by Smith; he gave her the name for this film.

"  "I believe it to be absolutely real", said Smith,   "honest Australian, without any artificiality, burlesque, or exaggeration of types.   There are no bushrangers, there are only true Australian people, and the film is as clear as the air of Kosciusko itself, and I  believe the public will like it be cause of this".

Shooting
Shooting began in June 1920 on location at Mulgoa, Wallacia and Luddenham in the Blue Mountains.

In order to obtain footage for the climactic race, Smith held a race day and invited horsemen from the local area to participate in four races at Luddenham.

Reception

Critical
Smith's Weekly praised the movie saying it had:
Charming scenery, helped by clever photography and lighting. The story i» wholesomely exciting, with touches of kindlyhumour. The acting is excellent, though no great demands are ' made on those concerned...Mr. Smith is wise to show bush folk inan attractive light, whilst sacrificing nothing of the Australian atmosphere. Here, at last, is a picture, not only for local consumption, but one that will be welcomed overseas.
Everyone's called the film:
A top-notch Australian production that revives one’s hopes for the establishment of a   great movie industry in the Commonwealth.   Beaumont Smith shows... what can be done with Australian scenery for backgrounds, and an Australian poem as the pivot for an interesting plot characterised by quick action.   Thq, personalities of Paterson’s verses are skilfully interwoven with a   story into which the woman interest   "is cleverly in troduced...  City and country alike will hail the   ’'Man from Snowy River"   scenically, and in both photographic and acting senses as the best Australian movie yet.

Proposed Sequel
When Smith finished the film he announced plans for a sequel Clancy of the Overflow. but this was never made.

See also
 Snowy River

References

Notes
 "The Dictionary of Performing Arts in Australia – Theatre . Film . Radio . Television – Volume 1" – Ann Atkinson, Linsay Knight, Margaret McPhee – Allen & Unwin Pty. Ltd., 1996

External links
The Man from Snowy River and Other Verses by Banjo Paterson at Project Gutenberg
The Man from Snowy River (1920 film) at National Film and Sound Archive

 Photo of Beaumont Smith directing The Man from Snowy River at Mulgoa at State Library of NSW

1920 films
Australian drama films
Films based on poems
Films based on works by Australian writers
The Man from Snowy River
Australian silent feature films
Films directed by Beaumont Smith
Lost Australian films
Australian black-and-white films
1920 drama films
1920 lost films
Lost drama films
Silent drama films